The County of Auburn is a county (a cadastral division) in the Darling Downs region of Queensland, Australia. Much of its area is within the Barakula State Forest. It was named and bounded by the Governor in Council on 7 March 1901 under the Land Act 1897.

Parishes
Auburn is divided into parishes, as listed below:

References

External links
 

Auburn